Thalheimer is a surname. Notable people with the surname include:

 August Thalheimer (1884–1948), a German Marxist theorist
 Bertha Thalheimer (1883–1959), a German Communist Party member
 Paul Thalheimer (1884–1948), a German painter
 Peter Thalheimer (1936–2018), a Canadian lawyer and politician
 Ricardo Thalheimer (born 1992), a Brazilian footballer
 Richard Thalheimer, an American investor

See also 
 Thalhimers, an American department store founded by William Thalhimer
 Thalhimer Tennis Center, a facility at the Virginia Commonwealth University